The Greece national rugby union team represents one of the world's newest rugby union playing nations. The national team is governed by the HHF (Hellenic Handball Federation).
Greece has been participating in international competitions since October 2005 playing its first international game against Austria in Vienna. 
Since then, they have played several international games in FIRA competition 3D, and in Greece. Greece played Slovakia in the Final on 12 May 2007 in Thessaloniki, where they won 20–17 and in doing so gained promotion to division 3C.

History
It is unknown when rugby was first played in Greece. During the mid 19th century, English and French sailors are recorded as playing some of the earliest games in northern Greece.

Record

Overall

Current squad
Squad to 2014 European Nations Cup – Division 2D.

Zurab Osiqmashvili
Alexi Kulukundis 
Konstantinos Kritsikis
Antonis Demertzis
Nathanael Courcelle
Ioannis Ktistakis
Ioannis Kostas
Ioannis Papakostopoulos
Nikos Mavreas (C)
Babtunji Kulukundis
Grigol Chatzis
Konstantinos Meidinger
Platon Moysiadis
Givi Gorgisheli
Quram Kizikurashrili
Chris Fiotakis
Alexandre Gounaris

Reserves
Petrov Plamen
Efitanos Papadopoulos
Benjamin Davidis
Levan Gamjashvili
Ioannis Vasileiadis
Georgios Barakos
Iason Dagdelenis
Georgios Papagiavis
Henry Dunn

References

External links
 National team news at the Greek Rugby Federation website
 Hellenic Rugby Federation (in English)
 National team news and comment at sportingreece.com (in English)
 Greek Rugby News (in Greek and English)

European national rugby union teams
Rugby union
Rugby union in Greece
Teams in European Nations Cup (rugby union)